This is a list of notable Jewish American historians. For other Jewish Americans, see Lists of Jewish Americans.

 Cyrus Adler
 Herbert Aptheker
 Bernard Bailyn
 Daniel J. Boorstin
 Norman Cantor
 Ariel Durant
 Stanley Elkins
 Richard Ettinghausen, art historian
 Norman Finkelstein, author and historian
 Robert Fogel, economist and historian
 Peter Gay
 Yosef Goldman
 Deborah Hertz
 Raul Hilberg
 Richard Hofstadter
 Joseph Jacobs, editor of the Jewish Encyclopedia
 Gabriel Kolko
 Bernard Lewis
 Deborah Lipstadt
 John Lukacs, Hungarian-born historian
 Erwin Panofsky
 Richard Popkin, historian of philosophy
 Meyer Schapiro
 Rosa Levin Toubin, historian of Jewish Texan history
 Barbara Tuchman
 Ron Unz, historian and writer
 Stanley M. Wagner, rabbi and academic
 Howard Zinn

References

Historians
Jewish